McJones Shaba is a Malawian politician. He was Malawi's Deputy Minister of Transport and Public Infrastructure in 2010. He has also been involved in public and agricultural works in the country and the National Forestry Plan.

References

Government ministers of Malawi
Living people
Year of birth missing (living people)